KXLR is a commercial active rock music radio station in Fairbanks, Alaska, broadcasting on 95.9 FM. It signed on the air in 1990 and was originally owned by Northern Television, the then-parent company of KTVF and KCBF.

In May 2007, KXLR switched from standard classic rock to album-oriented rock under the branding "X-Rock".  The "X-Rock" branding was also on sister station KXLW in Anchorage, which is now known as 96.3 The Wolf.  KXLR currently reports to Arbitron as an active rock station.

External links
95-9 X-Rock Online

Active rock radio stations in the United States
XLR